Brian Kamler (born February 12, 1972) is an American soccer coach and former player who is currently the head coach of Green Bay Voyageurs FC in USL League Two. As a player, he played two seasons in the USISL, winning the 1995 U.S. Open Cup and league titles with the Richmond Kickers, and ten seasons in Major League Soccer.

Youth
Kamler grew up in St. Louis, playing in local YMCA, church and club leagues as a boy.  In 1984, he joined the Anheuser Busch club which won the 1988 and 1989 D.J. Niotis Cup (U-16 National Championship).  He attended Parkway West High School in Chesterfield, Missouri where he was part of a state championship soccer team his freshman season.  In 1991, he entered Creighton University where he was a multi-position player until 1993.  He was a 1991 second  team, a 1992 second team and a 1993 first team All American.  Creighton inducted Kamler into the school’s Athletic Hall of Fame in 2002.

Professional
In 1994, Kamler left Creighton and signed with the expansion St. Louis Knights in the USISL.  In 1995, he moved to the Richmond Kickers, which won the league and 1995 U.S. Open Cup titles.  In February 1996, D.C. United selected Kamler in the 6th round of the 1996 MLS Inaugural Player Draft.  He played three and a half seasons with DC before being shipped to the Miami Fusion in 1999.  Kamler was sent back to DC United (in exchange for Carlos Llamosa) before the 2001 season, and spent a year there before being shipped to the MetroStars for Richie Williams. His stay with the Metros did not last long: midway through the year, Kamler was part of a massive six-player deal in which he wound up with the New England Revolution. After two and a half seasons with the Revs, it was time once again to pack his bag, as he was chosen by Real Salt Lake with the eighth overall pick of the 2004 MLS Expansion Draft.  In ten years in MLS, Kamler scored 12 league goals with 27 assists; half of his goals came in the 2003 season for the Revs. He retired following the 2005 season.

He was named MLS Humanitarian of the Year in 2005.

References

1972 births
Living people
All-American men's college soccer players
American soccer players
Creighton University alumni
Creighton Bluejays men's soccer players
D.C. United players
Major League Soccer players
New York Red Bulls players
Miami Fusion players
New England Revolution players
Real Salt Lake players
Richmond Kickers players
St. Louis Knights players
USISL players
Association football midfielders